Spanish Italy may refer to:
 Duchy of Milan under Spain (1535-1706).
 Italian territories of the Spanish Empire before the death of Charles II in 1700, overseen by the Council of Italy
 Kingdom of the Two Sicilies under Charles III of Spain and Ferdinand I of the Two Sicilies